The National Postgraduate Medical College of Nigeria is a parastatal of the Federal Government Ministry of Health. It was on September 24, 1979, under the decree No. 67 now Cap N59 Laws of the Federation 2004, as a corporate body to medical specialists, capable of providing world-class research, teaching and health care. 
Today, the college is the apex of medical education in Nigeria.
On September 14, 2015, the college faulted and objected  the dissolution of the Medical and Dental Council of Nigeria by Muhammadu Buhari, the President of Nigeria. The college insinuated that such premature dissolution of the council will encourage quackery and malpractice in the health sector.
The college organizes examinations for medical doctors in residency as well as the entrance primary examinations into several faculties. The examinations are usually written twice in a year across the country.
The college has been under scrutiny lately for its poor recognition around the world for its poorly updated medical education compared to other countries and it's non acceptance around the world.

Faculties
The college consists of fourteen faculties, including:
Faculty of Anaesthesia
Faculty of Dental Surgery
Faculty of Family Medicine
Faculty of General Dental Practice
Faculty of Internal Medicine
Faculty of Obstetrics and Gynaecology
Faculty of Ophthalmology
Faculty of Orthopaedics
Faculty of Otorhinolaryngology
Faculty of Paediatrics
Faculty of Pathology
Faculty of Psychiatry
Faculty of Public Health
Faculty of Radiology
Faculty of Surgery

References

Medical schools in Nigeria
Dental schools